Webster Reservoir is a reservoir in Rooks County, Kansas, United States. Built and managed by the U.S. Bureau of Reclamation, it is used for flood control, irrigation, and recreation. Webster State Park is located on its shore.

History
Construction of Webster Dam and Reservoir was approved as part of the Pick-Sloan Missouri Basin Program. Following the Great Flood of 1951, the U.S. Bureau of Reclamation determined the project could provide additional flood control and irrigation support to the region. Contractors started construction in March 1953, but a combination of funding problems and adverse weather caused multiple delays over the following years. Water storage in the reservoir began May 3, 1956, and the Webster project became formally operational September 1, 1956.

Area residents successfully organized Webster Irrigation District No. 4 and obtained a water right in December 1956. Construction of downstream irrigation infrastructure, including a diversion dam near Woodston, Kansas and the Osborne Canal, began in July 1957 and finished in April 1961.

Geography
Webster Reservoir is located in northwestern Kansas on the western edge of the Smoky Hills region of the Great Plains. It is located entirely within Rooks County.

The South Fork Solomon River is both the reservoir's primary inflow and outflow.

U.S. Route 24 runs generally east-west north of the reservoir. Kansas Highway 258 runs generally north-south along the top of Webster Dam.

There is one unincorporated settlement at Webster Reservoir:  Webster, Kansas, the reservoir's namesake, located just southeast of the dam.

Hydrography
The surface area, surface elevation, and water volume of the reservoir fluctuate based on inflow and local climatic conditions. In terms of capacity, the Bureau of Reclamation vertically divides the reservoir into a set of pools based on volume and water level, and it considers the reservoir full when filled to the capacity of its active conservation pool.

Infrastructure

Management
The U.S. Bureau of Reclamation operates and maintains Webster Dam and Reservoir.  The Kansas Department of Wildlife, Parks and Tourism (KDWP) manages  of land around the reservoir and upstream along the South Fork Solomon River as the Webster Wildlife Area.

Parks and recreation
The KDWP manages Webster State Park located on the shore of the reservoir. Both areas include boat ramps and camping facilities. The Oldtown Area also includes an amphitheater, swimming beaches, playgrounds, and a hiking trail.

Webster Reservoir is open for sport fishing. Hunting is permitted on the public land around the reservoir although it is restricted in the Wildlife Area.

Wildlife
Fish species resident in Webster Reservoir include bluegill, channel and flathead catfish, crappie, largemouth and smallmouth bass, rainbow trout, walleye, white bass, and wiper. Game animals living around the reservoir include deer, ducks, geese, pheasants, quail, and wild turkeys. Bald eagles are also present in the area.

See also
 List of Kansas state parks
 List of lakes, reservoirs, and dams in Kansas
 List of rivers of Kansas

References

External links
 Webster Dam, U.S. Bureau of Reclamation
 Webster State Park, Kansas Department of Wildlife, Parks and Tourism

Dams in Kansas
Reservoirs in Kansas
United States Bureau of Reclamation dams
Bodies of water of Rooks County, Kansas
Dams completed in 1956